John Paul Petro (July 9, 1930 – October 23, 1998) was a Canadian ice hockey player with the East York Lyndhursts. He won a silver medal at the 1954 World Ice Hockey Championships in Stockholm, Sweden. He also played for the Washington Lions in the Eastern Amateur Hockey League. In the 1951 Worlds, Petro scored 10 points (8 goals, 2 assists) in 7 games.

References

1930 births
1998 deaths
Canadian ice hockey left wingers
East York Lyndhursts players